Pumpkinflowers: A Soldier's Story, is a 2016 book by journalist Matti Friedman, published by Algonquin.

Terror selfie
Friedman describes a brief attack by the Lebanese Islamist group Hezbollah on the small Israeli army unit, Outpost Pumpkin, in the South Lebanon security zone on October 29, 1994. Friedman served at the outpost 3 years after the incident.    The attack was brief; Hezbollah fighters killed one Israeli soldier and wounded 2 others before withdrawing.  But the Hezbollah fighters shot a short, blurry video, which, with a soundtrack of gunfire and martial music, went viral.  It appears to show Hezbollah jihadis capturing an Israeli military position and planting a flag to symbolize victory.  Hezbollah claimed to have captured the outpost and “purified it of Zionists,” and the video caused a brief but anguished public discussion in Israel over the preparedness of the military. Friedman describes the video, now a familiar type, as having been "fresh and gripping" in 1994, and, arguably, the first of what would soon become an enormous wave of "terror selfies" aimed at projecting the illusion of Islamist military victory.

But this book is about so much more than a single incident, traumatic as it was. See http://mosaicmagazine.com/observation/2016/07/remembering-israels-forgotten-war/ for a better insight into Friedman's work here.

References

2016 non-fiction books
Battles involving Hezbollah
Hezbollah–Israel conflict
Canadian non-fiction books
Algonquin Books books